The Cosson is a  long river in central France, a right tributary of the river Beuvron. Its source is near the village of Vannes-sur-Cosson, Sologne. The Cosson flows through the following departments and communes: 
 Loiret: La Ferté-Saint-Aubin, La Ferté-Saint-Cyr
 Loir-et-Cher: Vineuil,  Candé-sur-Beuvron

The château de Chambord is built in one curve of the Cosson.

References

Rivers of France
Rivers of Centre-Val de Loire
Rivers of Loiret
Rivers of Loir-et-Cher